Mikhail Yurievich Bleiman (born 19 May 1904, Rostov-on-Don — 3 December 1973, Moscow) was a Russian and Soviet screenwriter and film critic.

Life and career
Moscow in 1923–1924. He worked as a journalist before specializing 
in screenplays.
Bleiman’s first two scripts were made into satirical shorts: History of an Advance Payment (Istoriia odnogo avansa, 1924), a morality tale about the dangers of alcohol abuse, 
and The Adventures of Vanka Gvozd (Pokhozhdeniia Vanki Gvozdia, 1924), a mockery of the Orthodox Church. Both were produced by a Komsomol-based company in Bleiman’s hometown Rostov-on-the 
Bleiman’s most well-known work is the screenplay for Fridrikh Ermler’s The Great Citizen (1937–1939, co-authored with Bolshintsov), a reflection of 
Stalinist strategies within the Bolshevik Party in the 1930s, showing 
Joseph Stalin’s struggle against the “leftist and rightist oppositions".

Bleiman was also successful with war dramas, authoring or co-authoring the scripts for Yuli Raizman’s Moscow Sky (1944), Leonid Lukov’s It Happened in the Donbas (1945), and most notably for Boris Barnet’s Secret Agent (with ), a spy film that won both the director and the 
screenwriters Stalin Prizes.
Bleiman was accused of “formalism” in the early 1930s. In 1948–1949, despite his loyal service to 
Stalin and the Communist Party, he became one of the major targets 
of the anti-Semitic campaign “against cosmopolitanism.” Among 
his noteworthy later screenwriting efforts are the Civil War story 
Restless Youth (Trevozhnaia molodost’, 1954)—the directing debut 
of Aleksandr Alov and Vladimir Naumov — and a hugely popular 
espionage dilogy, The Road to 'Saturn' (1967) and The 
End of Saturn (1968).

He was also a prolific film critic who regularly published his views on ideological and 
aesthetic aspects of Soviet cinema.

Filmography
Mutiny (1928)
My Motherland (1933)
Journey to Arzrum (1936)
The Great Citizen (1938)
Nebo Moskvy (1944)
It Happened in the Donbas (1945)
Secret Agent (1947)
Victorious Return (1947)
Three Encounters (1948)
The Road to 'Saturn' (1967)

Literature

References

External links

Soviet screenwriters
1904 births
1973 deaths
Writers from Rostov-on-Don